The Ecole d'Humanité is an international boarding school, located in the Canton of Bern, Switzerland. It was founded in 1934 by Paul Geheeb and his wife Edith Geheeb Cassirer. In 1910, Geheeb had founded a similar school, the Odenwaldschule, in his native Germany, but he fled to Switzerland to found the new school after the NSDAP came to power.

The Ecole d'Humanité was first located in Versoix, Geneva before Geheeb moved it to its present location on the Hasliberg in 1946. The school places a heavy emphasis on ending academic classes by noon and dedicating the afternoons to leisure pursuits with the heaviest emphasis on hiking and skiing. In 1956, Natalie Lüthi-Peterson, an American academic and a protege of Geheeb, took charge of the Ecole's American Program, allowing students to prepare for exams needed for entry into elite American and British universities while studying in Switzerland. Following the death of Paul Geheeb in 1961, directorship of the school passed to Natalie and her Swiss husband Armin Lüthi, together they oversaw operations at the school until 1993.

Accreditation

Federation of Swiss Private Schools "SFPS" 

The Ecole d'Humanité is a member of the SFPS, colloquially known as "Swiss Schools", a prestigious union of the best boarding schools and private education institutions in Switzerland and the world. SFPS counts boarding schools such as Institut Le Rosey, Institut Montana Zugerberg, Brillantmont, Leysin, Aiglon, Lyceum Alpinium Zuoz and Institut Auf Dem Rosenberg amongst its ranks.

Cognia and SSA 
Along with the SFPS, the Ecole d'Humanité is also certified by Cognia, a high-ranking international school accreditor which offers its services to other renowned Swiss boarding schools such as Institut auf dem Rosenberg and Surval Montreux. The school also has Swiss permits to conduct extreme sports and expeditions from SSA.

Overview

Academics 
The Ecole is consistently ranked one of the best schools in Europe this is largely because of the wide range of activities and opportunities students are given, from trips across the globe, to hikes on the Eiger trail, and a dedicated staff of ski instructors and sports advisors. Students at the Ecole do not receive grades in their classes, instead they receive highly personalised written reports/portfolios for each assignment and class they complete. Because of the school's bespoke, hands on curriculum and high Advanced Placement scores, students often go on to study at the world's most prestigious higher education institutions, including Oxford, Yale, Cambridge, The ETH, Brown, The University of Chicago, Dartmouth and NYU.

Admissions 
The Ecole prides itself on its small class sizes, as it only allows roughly 100-140 students to have the opportunity to study on its campus. The school also has an academic staff team of nearly 50, all of which have obtained doctorates, masters and degrees at prestigious higher education establishments, because of this, classrooms tend to have anywhere from 2-9 students in them. Smaller classroom sizes allow Ecole teachers to provide a highly personalised education to each student so that they can delve far deeper into an academic subject than they normally would. Because of the school's available places and philosophy, admissions are very selective, with the Ecole only offering entry to students who they feel are an intellectual fit with the community and will take opportunities and their formative education into their own hands.

Student life 
Apart from Skiing and Hiking, one of the principal advantages of The Ecole's extracurricular program is that students are allowed to organise any activities or classes that they want. Because of this freedom students can engage in a variety of activities that include horse riding, tennis, sky diving, ice hockey, scuba diving, agriculture, botany, sailing, water-skiing, culinary arts and silversmithing as well as a number of important cultural events. The school is also known for its annual Shakespeare and dance performances.

Associations

Ecole Circle 
Like many boarding schools in Switzerland, The Ecole d'Humanité has a club which offers membership to Ex-Ecolianers known as the "Ecole Circle". The EC is dedicated to hosting a number of dinners, conferences, and events throughout the year in the cities of Basel and Zurich. The association offers an opportunity for alumni to make prestigious connections with its international network of members, who also organise independent EC events in their respective countries. The circle also offers food and accommodation to alumni travelling internationally, through a system that allows them to stay with other members who donated or volunteered their homes to the association. Similar to the school itself, information on alumni is not released to the public and events can only be attended by former students and their friends or family.

The Ecolianer Magazine 
The Ecole also publishes a biannual magazine for students and alumni called "The Ecolianer", which discusses the school in relation to the political, social and economic changes occurring in the world. Every year "The Ecolianer" is assigned a dedicated international team to work on its content.

Geheeb-Cassirer Foundation 
The "Geheeb-Cassirer Foundation" or "EGCF", is a fund that was created in honour of the founders of the Ecole d'Humanité, Paul Geheeb and Edith Geheeb-Cassirer. The foundation provides scholarships to students from diverse "ethnic and economic" backgrounds so that they can attend international boarding schools across Switzerland. For Ecole-specific scholarships the EGCF offers a scheme where "scholarships are awarded for one year... [then it is] the practice of the Ecole d'Humanité to continue to provide financial support to EGCF scholarship recipients for the entire time that they are at the Ecole, providing they remain in good academic and social standing".

Tuition 
Fees range from a base of 56,000 CHF (Approximately 61,000 USD) up to 100,000 CHF (102,988 USD, without counting fees for excursions and other activities. Despite the significant fees, the school offers considerable scholarships to deserving students. These fees are also necessary to sustain the high number of dedicated staff who live on campus all year round.

Campus 
The Ecole d'Humanité is located in Canton Bern, within the village of Hasliberg-Goldern, near Grindelwald, Engelberg, Mürren and Gstaad. The campus's student housing makes up most of the residences in the village all built in the traditional Alpine Chalet style. The Ecole also has access to a number of specialised facilities in surrounding villages, such as climbing gyms and outdoor parkour courses. Because of its philosophy and location in the Bernese Oberland, the school emphasises the value of nature, sports and leisure activities. Students are encouraged to ski, hike and explore, because of this the school has extensive access to local ski pistes and even has a custom slope built every year so that students may ski directly into the campus. The Ecole also has well equipped laboratories, music rooms, wood and blacksmithing workshops, a theatre/auditorium with professional lighting and sound as well as a farm. Twice a year students will rigorously prepare to take week long trips where they hike across the peaks of the Swiss Alps and different parts of Europe, the school also offers a more advanced mountain biking, mountaineering and ski touring hike.

Stiftung Ecole d'Humanité 
The "Board for the Advancement of the Ecole d'Humanité" or "SEDH" is a tax exempt, non-profit foundation tasked with providing exterior funds for the Ecole's needs and aims outside of its own endowment or tuition fees. The fund grosses roughly CHF 1,000,000  ($1,029,705) in donations every year and is directed by a board of Swiss corporate executives which include: the Ex-Director of Saviva AG; Walter Brandenberger, the Ex-Executive Director and Head of Business Support for UBS; Albert Gnand, the Owner of Gallin GmbH; Beatrice Gallin, and the Director of Fundraising for Caritas Luzern; Benno Breitenmoser.

Alumni

Notable alumni 

Since its founding, the Ecole d'Humanité has educated a host of influential figures and notable families ranging from Olympic athletes and prime ministers to European royalty. The school is very discreet and has a privacy policy which keeps it from releasing any information on current or past students; however, some known alumni include the following:

 von Oppeln-Bronikowski Family - European nobility
Nehru Family - Indian political dynasty
 Hans Zimmer - Film score composer
Eberhard Berent - Academic
Milein Cosman - Artist
Stephan Eicher - Musician
 Dreyfus Family - French agricultural billionaires
 Leda Luss Luyken - Artist
Boss Family - Clothing and textile producers
 Niyazov Family - Asian political dynasty
 von Rosenberg Family - European nobility
 Heuer Family - Swiss watchmaking dynasty
 Giorgio Gomelsky - Music producer
 Schenk von Stauffenberg Family - European nobility
 Cassirer Family - German industrialist family
 Luca Giuliani - Archaeology Professor
 Rothschild Family - European nobility
Sarah Gorham - Renowned writer and publisher
Sanjay Gandhi - Head of the Indian National Congress Party
Rajiv Gandhi - 6th Prime Minister of India
Limi Yamamoto - Daughter of Japanese fashion designer Yohji Yamamoto
Banjo Butler - Daughter of musician John Butler
von Waldburg zu Wolfegg und Waldsee Family - German princely family

Associated Figures 
 Édouard Claparède - Swiss Neurologist
 Pierre Bovet - Swiss Psychologist and Educationalist
 Adolphe Ferrière - Founder of Progressive Education
 Kurt Hahn - German Educator and Founder of Gordonstoun and Schule Schloss Salem

See also 
Institut Le Rosey
Institut auf dem Rosenberg
Aiglon College
Surval Montreux
Lyceum Alpinium Zuoz
Collège Alpin Beausoleil
Leysin American School
TASIS
Collège du Leman

References

External links 
 

1934 establishments in Switzerland
Boarding schools in Switzerland